A Short Stay in Switzerland is a 2009 British television film directed by Simon Curtis and written by Frank McGuinness. It stars Julie Walters, who won the International Emmy Award for Best Actress for her performance as Dr Anne Turner. It was produced by the BBC and was later released on DVD in regions 1 and 2.

It was also nominated for other numerous awards including the BAFTA Award for Best Single TV Drama and Best Actress.

Plot
Having recently witnessed the death of her husband from a neurological disease, Dr Anne Turner is diagnosed with a near-identical illness and determines to end her life once her condition has reached a critical point. As her health deteriorates, Anne's son, Edward, and two daughters, Sophie and Jessica, struggle to reach a consensus over their mother's intentions to end her life in an assisted dying facility (Dignitas) in Switzerland (where this is legal) and while they search for alternative options, silent recriminations and stubborn practicality threaten to tear the family apart. With her family at loggerheads, Anne must also face the fury of her best friend, whose opposing views bring them into direct conflict.

Cast
 Julie Walters as Dr Anne Turner
 Stephen Campbell Moore as Edward
 Lyndsey Marshal as Jessica
 Liz White as Sophie
 Michelle Fairley as Mrs Savery
 Will Knightley as Dr Jack Turner
 Patrick Malahide as Richard
 Harriet Walter as Clare
 Bruce Alexander as Doctor

Background
The film was inspired by the true story of Dr Anne Turner (25 January 1939 - 24 January 2006), who took her own life in a Zurich clinic, having developed the incurable neurodegenerative disease progressive supranuclear palsy (PSP). Before being diagnosed with PSP, Dr Turner had nursed her husband until he died from a similar disease, multiple system atrophy (MSA). Her brother also was victim of a progressive condition, motor neurone disease.

References

External links

2009 television films
2009 films
Assisted suicide
British films based on actual events
Films directed by Simon Curtis
2009 drama films
2000s English-language films
2000s British films
British drama television films